Self Medication is an album by the New York City ska band The Slackers. It was released on Indication Records in 2008 (See 2008 in music).

Track listing
 "Every Day Is Sunday" (Geard) – 2:35
 "Don't You Want a Man" (Hillyard) – 3:30
 "Don't Forget the Streets" (Ruggiero) – 3:26
 "Estranged" (Pine) – 3:52
 "Stars" (Ruggiero) – 4:29
 "Leave Me" (Nugent) – 2:58
 "Eviction" (Pine) – 4:54
 "Happy Song" (Hillyard) – 2:21
 "Self Medication" (Ruggiero/Nugent) – 4:11
 "Don't Have To" (Geard) – 2:03
 "Walking with Myself" (Hillyard/Ruggiero) – 4:05
 "Sing Your Song" (Ruggiero) – 3:51

Personnel

Players
 Ara Babajian – drums
 Marcus Geard – bass
 David Hillyard – saxophone
 Jay Nugent – guitar, sitar
 Glen Pine – trombone, vocals, percussion
 Vic Ruggiero – organ, piano, vocals, harmonica, banjo, guitar, accordion, percussion

Additional Players
 Glen Hackett – drums on 2, 3, 8, 9, 10
 Ben Lewis – trumpet on 3, 9, 10
 Rolf Langsjoen – trumpet on 3, 5
 Rob Jost – French horn on 3, 12
 Jeremy Meyers – vocals on 3, 8
 Martin Scaiff – clarinet on 9

2008 albums
The Slackers albums